Jarlsberg Travbane is a harness racing track located in Tønsberg, Norway. Owned by Norwegian Trotting Association, its tote betting is handled by Norsk Rikstoto. The venue opened in 1935.

References

External links
 Official website

Sports venues in Vestfold og Telemark
Harness racing venues in Norway
Event venues established in 1935
1935 establishments in Norway